Anniversary Peak is a  summit in The Bugaboos of British Columbia, Canada. It is located southeast of the Bugaboo Glacier, on the southern boundary of Bugaboo Provincial Park. Precipitation runoff from Anniversary Peak drains into Bugaboo Creek which is a tributary of the Columbia River.

History
Anniversary Peak was climbed by 43 persons of the Alpine Club of Canada in five parties in July 1946. The club so-named the peak because it was the 40th anniversary of the club's inception. The mountain's toponym was published in "A Climber's Guide to the Interior Ranges of British Columbia" by J.M. Thorington in 1947, and it was officially adopted on October 29, 1962, by the Geographical Names Board of Canada.

Climate
Based on the Köppen climate classification, Anniversary Peak is located in a subarctic climate zone with cold, snowy winters, and mild summers. Winter temperatures can drop below −20 °C with wind chill factors below −30 °C. This climate supports the Bugaboo Glacier below the peak's northwest slope.

Gallery

See also
 The Bugaboos
 Geography of British Columbia

References

External links
 Anniversary Peak: weather

Columbia Valley
Two-thousanders of British Columbia
Purcell Mountains
Kootenay Land District